Ludwik Turowski (27 July 1901 – 14 September 1973) was a Polish cyclist. He competed in the tandem event at the 1928 Summer Olympics.

References

External links
 

1901 births
1973 deaths
Polish male cyclists
Olympic cyclists of Poland
Cyclists at the 1928 Summer Olympics
Cyclists from Warsaw